Shadi Sukiya is a Palestinian who was arrested by the Israel Defense Forces in International Solidarity Movement (ISM)'s Jenin office on March 27, 2003. Israel argued, he was a senior Islamic Jihad member.

Controversy
The ISM's statements and those of the Israeli government both state that Sukiya arrived at the ISM's office as he was being pursued through the streets of Jenin by IDF soldiers during an Israeli-imposed curfew. According to the ISM's account, he had been going door to door looking for a place to go, arrived at the building (which is also used by the Red Cross and Medecins Sans Frontieres) cold and wet, and was offered a chance to dry and warm up by an ISM volunteer.

The IDF originally suggested that two Kalashnikov assault rifles and a handgun were found on the premises, but subsequently backtracked on the allegation (it appears the weapons were found during the operation, but not in the ISM's building).

In May 2003 the ISM's Adam Shapiro stated that Sukiya was not named a "senior Islamic Jihad terrorist" by any official Israeli military or government source, and was being held in administrative detention in Israel without any charge. However, ISM members have admitted that they have worked on non-violent protests with members of Hamas and Palestinian Islamic Jihad.

References

External links
Israeli Ministry of Foreign Affairs Press Release, March 27, 2003

Islamic Jihad Movement in Palestine members
Living people
Year of birth missing (living people)